Carharrack, Gwennap and St Day was an electoral division of Cornwall in the United Kingdom which returned one member to sit on Cornwall Council between 2013 and 2021. It was abolished at the 2021 local elections, being succeeded by Redruth Central, Carharrack and St Day and Lanner, Stithians and Gwennap.

Councillors

Extent
Carharrack, Gwennap and St Day represented the villages of St Day, Carharrack, Cusgarne, Gwennap and the hamlets of Tolgullow, Little Beside, Crofthandy, Vogue, Tolcarne, Higher and Lower Ninnis, Busveal, Coombe, Frogpool. The hamlet of Treviskey was shared with the Lanner and Stithians division. Part of Scorrier was also covered (it was shared with the Redruth North, Mount Hawke and Portreath, and Chacewater, Kenwyn and Baldhu divisions). The division covered 2065 hectares in total.

Election results

2017 election

2013 election

References

Electoral divisions of Cornwall Council